A Monster at Christmas is a fantasy horror poem by Thomas Canty.  The poem, a stranger Christmas fantasy was first published in 1985 by Donald M. Grant, Publisher, Inc.  Though a well-known artist, Canty chose Phil Hale to illustrate his book.  While the book's colophon states that 1,050 copies were printed, the actual number was 890. All copies were numbered and signed by the author and artist.

Notes

References

1985 books
American poems
Christmas poems
Donald M. Grant, Publisher books